Exhibit A may refer to:
 An exhibit (legal) in a courtroom often labelled Exhibit A, Exhibit B etc.
 Exhibit A (art exhibition), a 1992 art exhibition at the Serpentine Gallery, London
 Exhibit A (The Features album), 2004
 Exhibit A (Missin' Linx album)
 "Exhibit A (Transformations)", a music single
 Exhibit A (film), a 2007 British independent film
 Exhibit A: Secrets of Forensic Science, a television series